Osmosis Jones: Music from the Motion Picture is the soundtrack to the 2001 film Osmosis Jones. It was released on July 27, 2001 through Atlantic Records and consisted of hip hop and contemporary R&B. The soundtrack failed to make it to any Billboard charts, but Trick Daddy's single "Take It to da House" managed to make it to 88 on the Billboard Hot 100.

Track listing

Samples
 "Summer in the City" contains an interpolation of "Summer in the City" written by John Sebastian, Mark Sebastian, Steve Boone and performed by The Lovin' Spoonful.
 "Take It to da House" contains excerpts from "The Boss" written and performed by James Brown and "Boogie Shoes"  written by Harry "KC" Wayne Casey and Richard Finch and performed by KC and the Sunshine Band
 "Just in Case" contains excerpts from "Renee" by the Lost Boyz
 "Love Me or Leave Me" contains a sample from "Pearls" written by Sade Adu and Andrew Hale and performed by Sade
 "Rider Like Me" contains an uncredited interpolation of "Ambitionz Az a Ridah" by 2Pac

Additional songs in the film not on the soundtrack album
"Key to My Heart" written by Craig David and Jeremy Paul and performed by Craig David
"Groovejet (If This Ain't Love)" written by Cristiano Spiller, Sophie Ellis-Bextor and Rob Davis and performed by Spiller featuring Sophie Ellis-Bextor
"Hot Blooded (Philip Steir Remix)" written by Mick Jones and Lou Gramm and performed by Foreigner
"Alone Again (Naturally)" written and performed by Gilbert O'Sullivan
"Run On (Sharam Instrumental Mix)" written and performed by Moby
"Pump and Snap" written by Dennis White, Richard Vission, David Schommer, and Sam Hollander and performed by Control Freq
"Fill Me In" written by Craig David and Mark Hill and performed by Craig David

Bonus CD Sampler
The DVD and VHS release of the film featured a bonus CD sampler showcasing music from Atlantic Records. The first 3 songs are in their entirety, while the rest are only snippets. Only two of the songs featured here are on the soundtrack.

Sugar Ray – "Disasterpiece"
P.O.D. – "Satellite"
Willa Ford – "Ooh Ooh"
Craig David – "Fill Me In (Part 2)"
Ray J – "Formal Invite"
Little-T and One Track Mike – "Fome is Dape"
Nappy Roots – "Here We Go Again"
Invertigo – "Desensitized"

Hip hop soundtracks
2001 soundtrack albums
2000s film soundtrack albums
Atlantic Records soundtracks
Rhythm and blues soundtracks
Osmosis Jones